was a Japanese actor.

Career
Sazanka debuted as a singer in Asakusa in 1932 and was active on the vaudeville circuit as a member of the Akireta Bōizu. He made his film debut in 1946.

Selected filmography

Film

Television

References

External links

1914 births
1971 deaths
Male actors from Osaka
20th-century Japanese male actors